Line M6, officially referred to as the M6 Levent – Boğaziçi Üniversitesi/Hisarüstü line, is a  light metro line of the Istanbul Metro. The line opened for public service on 19 April 2015. Except for the very small Tünel, this line is the shortest of the Istanbul Metro system with only four stations.

Overview
The project was a cooperation between Istanbul Metropolitan Municipality and the Ministry of Transport, Maritime and Communication. The metro tunnel is a single tube, which is constructed  underground  by New Austrian Tunnelling method (NATM). The  line with four stations connects to the M2 Yenikapı - Hacıosman metro line at Levent station. In terms of passenger capacity, 8,100 passengers per hour per direction can be transported, which makes this a light metro line rather than a fully rapid transit line. M6 operates two 4-car trains (which can be increased to three trains), running with a top speed of  speed with at least 5–minute headways during peak hours. The travel time between the termini stations is 6–7 minutes.

It was initially planned to go into public service on 29 October 2014, on the Republic Day, but the metro line ultimately opened on 19 April 2015.

Connection to the F4 funicular line is available from the Boğaziçi University station to go Aşiyan on the Bosphorus.

Stations 
The M6 has a total of four stations, the least on any metro line in the city. The only connection to another metro line is at Levent, where connection to the M2 is available.

Rolling Stock
The line often uses two Alstom trains which are also used on M2, but sometimes one of the trains used is a Hyundai Rotem, again also used on M2.

See also 
 Public transport in Istanbul
 Istanbul Metro
 Istanbul modern tramways
 Istanbul nostalgic tramways

References

External links
  

Istanbul Metro
Public transport in Istanbul
Passenger rail transport in Turkey
Standard gauge railways in Turkey
2015 establishments in Turkey
Railway lines opened in 2015
Şişli